The Centre for Medieval Studies at the University of Bergen, Norway was founded as a Centre of Excellence by the Research Council of Norway. It operated from 2002 to 2012.

The organization's site defined its goal as: "to enhance our understanding of Europe as a whole, in the Middle Ages as well as today, from a peripheral point of view".  

It was headed by Sverre Bagge.

References

External links
Official Site

Medieval studies research institutes
University of Bergen